Pablo Arturo Ordano Saucedo (born 21 May 1994) is a Paraguayan professional footballer who plays as a defender for Defensores Unidos.

Career
Ordano, though born in Paraguay, started his career in neighbouring Argentina. He played in the youth set-ups of Nueva Chicago and Deportivo Riestra, prior to signing with Deportivo Laferrere in 2006. Seven years later, Ordano made the breakthrough into senior football with the Primera C Metropolitana outfit. Nine matches arrived in his debut season of 2012–13 as they placed second, which was the start of one hundred and fifty-two appearances in all competitions for them whilst also scoring eight times; the first came against Ferrocarril Midland in 2015, while the last two arrived in a fixture with Ituzaingó. Ordano decided to leave in 2018.

On 30 June 2018, Ordano joined Defensores Unidos of Primera B Metropolitana. His opening appearances for the Zárate team occurred in the Copa Argentina against Primera División duo Godoy Cruz and Newell's Old Boys.

Personal life
Ordano is the brother-in-law of Raúl Nieva, who played professionally for Deportivo Laferrere.

Career statistics
.

References

External links

1994 births
Living people
Place of birth missing (living people)
Paraguayan footballers
Association football defenders
Paraguayan expatriate footballers
Expatriate footballers in Argentina
Paraguayan expatriate sportspeople in Argentina
Primera C Metropolitana players
Primera B Metropolitana players
Deportivo Laferrere footballers
Defensores Unidos footballers